Martin Falter (born November 27, 1983) is a Czech professional ice hockey goaltender. He finished his active career in HC Kometa Brno. Currently he is a goaltender coach in HC Olomouc.

Playing career 
He played with HC Kladno in the Czech Extraliga during the 2010–11 Czech Extraliga season. In the 2011–12 Czech Extraliga season he played in HC Sparta Praha. On May 2, 2012, Falter signed a two-years contract with HC Kometa Brno.

References

External links

1983 births
Czech ice hockey goaltenders
Rytíři Kladno players
HC Sparta Praha players
HC Kometa Brno players
Living people
Sportspeople from Ostrava
HC Olomouc players
HC Vítkovice players
MHk 32 Liptovský Mikuláš players
Czech expatriate ice hockey players in Slovakia